Fred Drake (January 28, 1958 – June 20, 2002) was an American musician best known as a founding member of earthlings?. Drake is also renowned for having been co-owner (along with Dave Catching) of Rancho De La Luna, the setting for the collaborative musical project The Desert Sessions, in which he took part.

Drake recorded with a wide variety of musicians including; Daniel Lanois, Josh Homme, Queens of the Stone Age, Victoria Williams, Dave Grohl, Ted Quinn, Pete Stahl, Wool, Dean Ween and many others.

Fred released three solo works: Sky Party, Twice Shy and Shy Party.

He is credited with influencing the "desert sound" which has great depth and direction, taking advantage of stereo and quadraphonic effects as well as 32 track digital recording. Drake lived in Joshua Tree, California, Hollywood, Texas, and London.  He died of cancer in 2002.

Partial discography
Twice Shy (2001)
The Sky Party (2004)

References 

American rock musicians
American LGBT musicians
2002 deaths
1958 births
Deaths from lung cancer
20th-century American musicians
People from Joshua Tree, California
Earthlings? members
20th-century American LGBT people